GroupLogic, Inc., founded in 1988 and headquartered in Arlington, Virginia, U.S., is an enterprise software company that develops, sells and supports software for moving and storing data including activEcho, mobilEcho, ArchiveConnect, MassTransit and ExtremeZ-IP. GroupLogic’s products are used by information technology organizations to allow employees to access and manage corporate files regardless of the type of computing platform the employee is using to access the network.

On September 13, 2012, GroupLogic announced that it became a subsidiary of Acronis, a software company specializing in backup and disaster recovery products and services.

References

Sources

</ref>
Slate Group Logic: What can a tiny software firm show us about the future of American exports 16-Nov-2010
Mac Observer Interviews Group Logic CEO
BusinessWeek Private Company Information: Group Logic, Inc.
 Key Issues for Managed File Transfer, 2009 19 February 2009 | ID:G00165299
Moving Beyond MFT to File Services 29 May 2009 | ID:G00168386
Data Encryption Not Enough to Prevent FTP Credential Theft 6 July 2009 | ID:G00169584
Hype Cycle for Data and Application Security, 2009 17 July 2009 | ID:G00168605

External links
Company website

Software companies based in Virginia
File sharing
Mobile software
IOS software
Windows Internet software
Network file systems
Data synchronization
Email attachment replacements
Defunct software companies of the United States